The Central Philippine languages are the most geographically widespread demonstrated group of languages in the Philippines, being spoken in southern Luzon, Visayas, Mindanao, and Sulu. They are also the most populous, including Tagalog (and Filipino), Bikol, and the major Visayan languages Cebuano, Hiligaynon, Waray, Kinaray-a, and Tausug, with some forty languages all together.

Classification

Overview
The languages are generally subdivided thus (languages in italics refer to a single language):
Tagalog (at least three dialects found in southern Luzon)
Bikol (eight languages in the Bicol Peninsula)
Bisayan (eighteen languages spoken in the whole Visayas, as well as southeastern Luzon, northeastern Mindanao and Sulu)
Mansakan (eleven languages of the Davao Region)

There are in addition several Aeta hill-tribal languages of uncertain affiliation: Ata, Sorsogon Ayta, Tayabas Ayta, Karolanos (Northern Binukidnon), Magahat (Southern Binukidnon), Sulod, and Umiray Dumaget.

Most of the Central Philippine languages in fact form a dialect continuum and cannot be sharply distinguished as separate languages. Blust (2009) notes that the relatively low diversity found among the Visayan languages is due to recent population expansions.

Zorc (1977)
The expanded tree of the Central Philippine languages below is given in David Zorc's 1977 Ph.D. dissertation. The Visayan subgrouping is Zorc's own work, while the Bikol subgrouping is from McFarland (1974) and the Mansakan subgrouping from Gallman (1974).

Individual languages are marked by italics, and primary branches by bold italics.

Tagalog
Standard Filipino
Marinduque
Lubang
Bikol
Pandan (North Catanduanes)
Inland Bikol
Iriga (Rinconada Bikol)
Albay Bikol
Coastal Bikol (including the Naga City dialect)
Central Bikol 
Virac (South Catanduanes)
Visayan
1. South (spoken on the eastern coast of Mindanao)
Butuan–Tausug
Tausug
Butuanon
Surigao
Surigaonon, Jaun-Jaun, Kantilan, Naturalis
2. Cebuan (spoken in Cebu, Bohol, western Leyte, northern Mindanao, and eastern Negros)
Cebuan
Cebuano, Boholano, Leyte
3. Central (spoken across most of the Visayan region)
Warayan
Waray–Samar
Waray, Samar-Leyte
Northern Samar
Gubat (South Sorsogon)
Peripheral
Sorsogon (North), Masbate
Camotes
Bantayan
Hiligaynon (Ilonggo), Capiznon, Kawayan
Romblon
Romblomanon
4. Banton/Asi (spoken in northwestern Romblon Province)
Banton
Banton, Odionganon, Simara, Calatrava, Sibale
5. West
Aklan (spoken in northern Panay)
Aklanon
Kinarayan (spoken in Panay)
Pandan, Kinaray-a, Gimaras
North-Central (spoken on Tablas Island and the southern tip of Mindoro)
Bulalakaw, Dispoholnon, Looknon, Alcantaranhon
Kuyan (spoken in the archipelagos west of Panay and Romblon, as well as the southern tip of Mindoro)
Datagnon, Santa Teresa, Semirara
Kuyonon
Mansakan
North Mansakan
Kamayo (North) and Kamayo (South)
Davaw
Davawenyo (Davaweño)
Eastern Mansakan
Isamal
Caraga (Karaga)
Kabasagan, Boso, Mansaka, Mandayan
Western Mansakan
Kalagan and Tagakaolo
Mamanwa
Mamanwa

Gallman (1997)
Andrew Gallman (1997) rejects Zorc's classification of the Mansakan languages and Mamanwa as primary branches of the Central Philippine languages coordinate to the Bisayan languages. Instead, he groups Mansakan, Mamanwa and the Southern Bisayan languages together into an "East Mindanao" subgroup, which links up with the remaining Bisayan branches in a "South Central Philippine" subgroup:

Tagalog
Bikol
South Central Philippine
West Bisayan
Banton
Central Bisayan
Cebuan
East Mindanao
North East Mindanao
Mamanwa
Surigaonon
Butuanon-Tausug
Central East Mindanao
Kamayo
Davawenyo (Banganga)
Davawenyo (Digos)
South East Mindanao
Mandaya (Kabasagan)
Mandaya (Caraga)
Mansaka, Mandaya (Maragusan), Mandaya (Boso)
(Branch)
Mandaya (Islam)
Kalagan (Kaagan), Kalagan (Tagakaulu)

Greater Central Philippine (Blust)

Blust (1991) notes that the central and southern Philippines has low linguistic diversity. Based on exclusively shared lexical innovations, he posits a Greater Central Philippine subgroup that puts together the Central Philippine branch with South Mangyan, Palawan, Danao, Manobo, Subanon and Gorontalo–Mongondow languages, the latter found in northern Sulawesi.

References

 
Greater Central Philippine languages